Omotayo Daniel "Tayo" Adaramola (born 14 November 2003) is an Irish footballer who plays as a left-back for  Crystal Palace, and for the Republic of Ireland U19 national team. He made his debut for the Ireland under-19s in 2021.

Early life
Originally from Dublin, Adaramola was born to Nigerian parents on 12 November 2003. He made his start in football at Dublin clubs St. Kevin's Boys and St. Mochta's, later joining the Crystal Palace academy at the under-12 level after moving with his family to London to improve his chances of becoming a professional footballer. Before signing with Palace, Adaramola also had trials with Charlton and West Ham.

Club career
Adaramola signed his first professional contract with  Crystal Palace in 2020, going on to play for the club's under-18 and under-23 sides throughout the 2020–2021 season.
In February 2022, Adaramola made his senior debut for Crystal Palace, coming on as a substitute in the second half of an FA Cup win over Hartlepool United. 
He made his first start for the club against Stoke City in the fifth round of the FA Cup on 1 March 2022.
After playing with the Crystal Palace first team for a preseason tour of Singapore and Australia during the summer of 2022, Adaramola completed a loan move to Coventry City of the EFL Championship for the 2022–23 season, but returned to Crystal Palace on 2 September.

Career statistics

International career
Eligible to play for the Republic of Ireland and Nigeria, Adaramola was first called up to the Republic of Ireland U17s in 2020. He made his debut for the Republic of Ireland U19s in a friendly match against the Sweden U19s on 8 October 2021, and in  May 2022 he received his first Under-21 call-up. On 6 June 2022, Adaramola made his debut for the Republic of Ireland U21 team in a 3–1 win over Montenegro U21 at Tallaght Stadium.

References

2003 births
Living people
Association footballers from Dublin (city)
Republic of Ireland association footballers
Republic of Ireland expatriate association footballers
Irish people of Nigerian descent
Association football defenders
St. Kevin's Boys F.C. players
Crystal Palace F.C. players
Coventry City F.C. players
Republic of Ireland youth international footballers
Expatriate footballers in England
Irish expatriate sportspeople in England
Black Irish sportspeople
Irish sportspeople of African descent